Basanta Kumar Das was a Member of the 2nd National Assembly of Pakistan as a representative of East Pakistan.

Early life
Das was born into a Bengali Hindu family in Sylhet, Assam Province, British Raj. His home was in Chalibandar in Sylhet town.

Career
Das was a Member of the 2nd National Assembly of Pakistan. He served as the leader of the opposition in the East Bengal Assembly.

References

Pakistani MNAs 1955–1958
Possibly living people
People of East Pakistan
People from Sylhet